Family Tree is an album by American world music/jazz group Oregon featuring Ralph Towner, Paul McCandless, Glen Moore, and Mark Walker recorded in April 2012 and released on the CAM Jazz label. It was the final Oregon recording to feature bassist Glen Moore.

Reception
The Allmusic review by Thom Jurek awarded the album 4 stars stating that "Oregon have remained vital, restless, and disciplined". In his review for All About Jazz, John Kelman concludes "... with Family Tree this sixteen year-old incarnation has delivered an album that easily stands up to recordings like Winter Light (Vanguard, 1973) and Out of the Woods (Elektra, 1978), as one of Oregon's very best."

Track listing
All compositions by Ralph Towner except where noted.
 "Bibo Babo" — 6:55 
 "Tern" — 5:22
 "The Hexagram" — 5:54 
 "Creeper" — 5:34
 "Jurassic" (Oregon) — 2:28 
 "Family Tree" — 6:31 
 "Stritch" (Oregon) — 2:47 
 "Mirror Pond" — 5:53
 "Moot" (Glen Moore) — 5:48
 "Julian" (Paul McCandless) — 4:31
 "Max Alert" (Oregon) — 1:07
 "Carnival Express" — 8:01
Recorded at Bauer Studios, Ludwigsburg, Germany in April 2012.

Personnel
Musicians
Paul McCandless - bass clarinet, flute, English horn, oboe, soprano saxophone
Glen Moore - bass
Ralph Towner - classical guitar, piano, synthesizer
Mark Walker - drums, hand percussion, percussion

Production credits
 Andrea Boccalini - photography
 Danilo Rossi - mastering
 Johannes Wohlleben - engineering, mixing

References

Oregon (band) albums
2012 albums
CAM Jazz albums